Seririt (town) is a small town and capital of Seririt District in the regency of Buleleng in northern Bali, Indonesia.

Populated places in Bali